This is the complete list of Commonwealth Games medallists in women's athletics from 1934 to 2022.

Current events

100 metres

200 metres

400 metres

800 metres

1500 metres

5000 metres

10,000 metres

100 metres hurdles

400 metres hurdles

3000 metres steeplechase

4 × 100 metres relay

4 × 400 metres relay

Marathon

10 km walk

High jump

Pole vault

Long jump

Triple jump

Shot put

Discus throw

Hammer throw

Javelin throw

Heptathlon

Disability events

100 metres T12

100 metres T37

800 metres T54

1500 metres T54

Long jump F37/38

Shot put seated

Shot put F32-34/52/53

Discontinued events

80 metres hurdles

100 yards

220 yard

440 yard

880 yard

20 kilometres race walk

4 × 110 yards relay

110-220-110 yards relay

220-110-220-110 relay

Pentathlon

References

Results Database from the Commonwealth Games Federation

Athletics
Medalists

Commonwealth
Commonwealth Games